The Order of the Black Eagle was the highest title that could be bestowed on a citizen of the Principality of Albania. The order was established by Prince Wied in 1914 on the example of the Prussian Order of the Black Eagle. The order had a black eagle and around the words Besë e Bashkim.

Since the Principality of Albania was short-lived, the order was awarded very few times, and is considered today very rare for collectors. It is also considered to be the first award ever given in modern Albania.

See also
Orders, decorations and medals of Albania

References

Awards established in 1914
Orders, decorations, and medals of Albania
1914 establishments in Albania